The Bargain Store is the fifteenth solo studio album by American entertainer Dolly Parton. It was released on February 17, 1975, by RCA Victor. In the Parton-penned title track, one of her best-known compositions, she used worn, second-hand merchandise in a discount store as a metaphor for a woman damaged by an ill-fated relationship. The song was dropped from a number of country stations' playlists when programmers mistook the line "you can easily afford the price" as a thinly veiled reference to prostitution. Despite the decrease in airplay, the song nonetheless topped the U.S. country singles charts in April 1975.

The album was largely made up of Parton's own compositions but also contained Merle Haggard's "You'll Always Be Special to Me". (Haggard, in turn, covered Parton's "Kentucky Gambler", from this album, later in 1975.)

The album was re-released for the first time in December 2013. It was made available as a digital download on iTunes. This is the first time that eight of the songs ("When I'm Gone", "The Only Hand You'll Need to Hold", "I Want to Be What You Need", "Love to Remember", "You'll Always Be Special to Me", "He Would Know" and "I'll Never Forget") have been made available outside of the original LP, cassette and eight-track releases of the album.

Track listing
All songs written by Dolly Parton unless otherwise noted.

References

External links
The Bargain Store at Dolly Parton On-Line

Dolly Parton albums
1975 albums
Albums produced by Bob Ferguson (music)
RCA Records albums